Astronet is a consortium which gather European funding agencies in order to establish a comprehensive long-term planning for the development of European astronomy. The consortium started on September 1, 2005.

Participants 
Centre national de la recherche scientifique/Institut national des sciences de l'univers (coordinator), France
Federal Ministry of Education and Research and PT-DESY, Germany
European Southern Observatory, International
Istituto Nazionale di Astrofisica, Italy
MCINN (now ), Spain
NOTSA
Nederlandse Organisatie voor Wetenschappelijk Onderzoek, the Netherlands
Science and Technology Facilities Council, United Kingdom
NCBiR, Poland

Associates 

ESA, International
MPG and DFG, Germany
LAS, Lithuania
SRC, Sweden
GNCA, Greece
HAS, Hungary
ESF, Estonia
SER, Switzerland
FWF, Austria
AI SAS, Slovak Republic
CAS, Czech Republic
ROSA, Romania
NASU, Ukraine
ARRS, Slovenia

Forum members 

ISA, Israel
Institute of Astronomy of the University of Latvia
Academy of Finland
Forskningsrådet for Natur og Univers (FNU), Denmark

Financing 

ASTRONET is an ERA-Net financed by the European Commission FP6 (under the initiative « Integrating and Strengthening the European Research Area (ERA) »), up to a level of 2.5 M€, out of a total budget of 3.2 M€. The project duration is 4 years.

See also 

European Extremely Large Telescope
European Northern Observatory
Cherenkov Telescope Array

References

Further reading 
 "Astronomers unveil wish list." Nature.
  "Himmlische Visionen für das All - Astronomen diskutieren die Großprojekte der." Deutschlandradio Kultur.
  "As the stars were born?." Expresso.

External links 
Official website
  "Mathematician with ASTRONET successful - New methods for calculation of trajectories in space."

Astronomy institutes and departments
Science and technology in Europe
International scientific organizations